Shan King is one of the 31 constituencies in the Tuen Mun District.

Created for the 1988 District Board elections for the first time and 2003 District Council elections for the second time, the constituency returns one district councillor to the Tuen Mun District Council, with an election every four years.

Shan King loosely covers areas surrounding Shan King Estate in Tuen Mun with an estimated population of 16,817.

Councillors represented

1988 to 1994

1994 to present

Election results

2010s

2000s

1990s

1980s

References

Tuen Mun
Constituencies of Hong Kong
Constituencies of Tuen Mun District Council
1988 establishments in Hong Kong
Constituencies established in 1988
2003 establishments in Hong Kong
Constituencies established in 2003